Gehraiyaan is a 2022 Indian noir romantic drama directed by Shakun Batra and produced by Dharma Productions in association with Viacom18 Studios and Jouska Films. The film stars Deepika Padukone, Siddhant Chaturvedi, Ananya Panday and Dhairya Karwa, with Rajat Kapoor and Naseeruddin Shah in supporting roles. 

Gehraiyaan premiered on 11 February 2022 on Amazon Prime Video. The film received mixed-to-positive reviews from critics, with praise for its soundtrack, cinematography and performances of the cast, with particular praise directed towards Padukone and Shah's performances; however its story, screenplay and climax received criticism.

Plot
Alisha "Al" Khanna, a 30-year-old yoga instructor is working on an app but struggling to find investors while providing for her boyfriend Karan Arora, an unemployed writer. She also suffers from anxiety, dealing with her mother Sonali's suicide as a child, and is estranged from her father Vinod. Alisha's cousin Tia "Ti" is engaged to Zain Oberoi and invites the couple to their Alibaug beach house. Zain and Alisha bond due to their traumatic past and flirt with each other. Later, Alisha kisses him, regretting it after, but learns that Karan has allowed Tia to read his draft and feels hurt as she had been asking to read it since a longtime. She allows Zain back in and they begin an affair.

Zain gets his business to invest in Alisha's app. He reveals to her that his father was violent towards him and his mother, which encouraged his move to America. Later, Karan proposes Alisha in front of all his family and friends, including Tia and Zain, and Alisha accepts his proposal. She ends her affair with Zain to focus on her new beginnings with Karan. But she breaks up with Karan, after finding out that his book had been rejected, before he proposed, and he hid this from her. She and Zain continue their affair, and Zain tells her that he will end things with Tia, after returning her investment in his company. Zain's company again invests in Alisha's app and provides her with a new yoga studio.

At Zain and Tia's anniversary party, Alisha reveals to Zain that she is pregnant. Zain's company is placed under investigation when one of his investors is charged with money laundering. After Tia finds Alisha's anxiety pills in Zain's jacket, she confronts him. He appeases her by saying that he is stressed from work. Alisha's yoga studio is sealed by the investigating officers from Zain's company, and she confronts him, in front of his co-workers, during a business meeting. Zain's business partner, Jitesh, deduces the truth about Zain's affair with Alisha. Tia agrees to mortgage the beach house in Alibaug to save the company, but Zain sells it instead, convinced he can buy it back within a year. At Alibaug, Tia accuses him of having an affair and asks to see his phone. When he shows her his phone, she feels guilty and signs the papers. Zain managed to change Alisha's contact information, on his phone, by changing her name to Jitesh, to make it look like Jitesh has another line. Karan tells Alisha that Tia is helping Zain with his company and both are in Alibaug. An angry Alisha gives Zain an ultimatum to reveal the truth to Tia, or she will.

Jitesh slyly suggests to Zain, that he can use drugs to get rid of the evidence, that Alisha is pregnant. Zain calls Alisha to his yacht and lies that he ended things with Tia. Alisha sees him mixing pills in her drink. Horrified, she tells Zain she wants to get back to land. Zain sees Tia's incoming call on Alisha's phone and asks her to decline; when she refuses, he attempts to push her overboard, but slips and hits his head on the railing of the yacht, drowning in the sea, as a result. A frightened Alisha rushes back home, where she has a miscarriage.

Tia calls the police and they find Zain's body. Jitesh, who knew about Zain's plan, threatens Alisha to get him the signed papers of the beach house sale or he will tell everyone the truth about their affair. Alisha does so and Jitesh covers up Zain's death as a suicide. Tia reveals to Alisha that her father had an affair with Alisha's mother, and Alisha was actually born from their affair. Tia also informs her that their dad had left the beach house in Alisha's name, in his will. Depressed, Alisha attempts to commit suicide, but is interrupted by her father. By not wanting to feel suffocated like her mother, Alisha realises she has ended up exactly like her. She questions her father on why he never told her the truth about her mother, he says that he did not want her mother's life to be defined by that one mistake.

Two years later, Alisha now has a better relationship with her father, and attends Karan's engagement party, where she meets Tia. Tia wonders if revealing the truth to her was right, but Alisha reassures her that it was. Tia, who is still unaware of the affair between Zain and Alisha, agrees to mend their relationship. Karan introduces them to his fiancée's grandmother, who recognises Alisha instantly after she and Zain had helped her and her husband from a stranded boat. Alisha stares blankly at the woman, realising that she cannot escape her past without confronting it.

Cast 
 Deepika Padukone as Alisha "Al" Khanna: Vinod and Sonali's daughter; Tia's cousin and half-sister; Karan's girlfriend; Zain's lover
 Ananya Anand as Young Alisha Khanna
 Siddhant Chaturvedi as Zain Oberoi: Jitesh's friend and business partner; Kumud's former employee; Tia's boyfriend and later fiancé; Alisha's lover
 Ananya Panday as Tia "Ti" Khanna: Kumud and Vaani's daughter; Alisha's cousin and half-sister; Zain's fiancée and girlfriend
 Arzoo as Young Tia Khanna
 Dhairya Karwa as Karan Singh Arora: Raman and Neetu's son; Tia's friend; Alisha's boyfriend
 Naseeruddin Shah as Vinod Khanna: Kumud's elder brother; Sonali's former husband; Alisha's father
 Imran Chappar as Young Vinod Khanna
 Rajat Kapoor as Jitesh Grover: Zain's business partner and friend
 Sahiil Sagar as Zain Oberoi's Office staff
 Vihaan Chaudhary as Bejoy Sen (Banker)
 Pavleen Gujral as Sonali Khanna: Vinod’s former wife; Kumud’s former lover; Alisha's mother (Died by Suicide)
 Deepak Kripalani as Raman Arora: Neetu's husband; Karan's father
 Kanika Dang as Neetu Arora: Raman's wife; Karan's mother
 Natasha Rastogi as Vaani Khanna: Kumud's first wife; Tia's mother 
 Anup Sharma as Kumud Khanna: Vinod's brother; Vaani's husband; Tia's father; Sonali's former lover and second husband
 Shataf Figar as Ranjeet
 Yamini Joshi as Sejal

Production

Development 
In April 2019, Shakun Batra was reported to direct the biopic on Osho, which was shelved. During the 21st edition of the MAMI film festival in October 2019, Batra was reported to direct Deepika Padukone in the lead, labelling the film's genre as domestic noir. In December 2019, Padukone went to the office of Dharma Productions and met Batra, where a script discussion about the film was held for a few minutes. Impressed by the narration, Padukone confirmed that she had a part in the film. In mid-December 2019, it was further reported that Vicky Kaushal and Siddhant Chaturvedi were reported to be playing the male leads, and another actress was reported to be on-board for the project. The latter was finalized and, in the very same month, Ananya Panday was finalized as the second female lead. Dhairya Karwa was cast in a leading role in March 2020.

Filming 
Pre-production of the film began in March 2020. Initially, filming was to proceed in Sri Lanka, however, amidst the COVID-19 pandemic and subsequent lockdown, the shoot was delayed by six months and moved to Goa, owing to its similar landscapes. The first schedule began in September 2020 and lasted approximately one month. The team returned to Mumbai in November 2020, where the filming resumed in December. Shooting for the next schedule commenced in Mumbai at the end of March 2021. Filming was wrapped up in August 2021. After being known as Production No. 70 for two years, a teaser was released on 20 December 2021, revealing the title of the film as Gehraiyaan.

The production had "intimacy department" of intimacy coach Neha Vyas and intimacy coordinator Aastha Khanna lead by intimacy director Dar Gai.

Music 

The film's music and original score is composed by independent musical duo Kabeer Kathpalia (OAFF) and Savera Mehta, in their mainstream film debut. Kausar Munir and Ankur Tewari wrote the lyrics for the songs. The track featured in the announcement teaser of the film is the Hindi version of "Frontline" sung by Lothika Jha and the Hindi lyrics were written by Tewari.

Reception 
Gehraiyaan received mixed-to-positive reviews from critics, with praise for its soundtrack, cinematography and performances of the cast, with particular praise directed towards Padukone and Shah's performances; however its story, screenplay and climax received criticism. 

Anna M. M. Vetticad of Firstpost gave the film a rating of 4/5 and wrote "Gehraiyaan has an enigmatic air from its opening scene, and gradually takes on an additional layer of unrelenting foreboding". Sanjana Jadhav of Pinkvilla gave the film a rating of 4 out of 5 and wrote "Batra's Gehraiyaan is a deep dive into individual and family's past choices, relationships and why we do, what we do. The director has successfully struck a balance of intimacy, shock, grief and above all love". Renuka Vyavahare of The Times Of India gave the film 3.5 out of 5 and wrote "Batra tries to decode complex human behaviour and its consequences, through a story that's tough to narrate". Umesh Punwani of Koimoi gave the film a rating of 3.5/5 and wrote "All said and done, I don't remember when was the last time a film's title did so much justice to its story". Devesh Sharma of Filmfare gave the film a rating of 3.5/5 and wrote "The film is shot quite beautifully by Kaushal Shah. A technically sound film having some fine performances and carrying a hint of mystery as well".

Roktim Rajpal of Deccan Herald rated the film 3.5/5 stars and wrote "Gehraiyaan makes an impact due to the effective screenplay and natural performances". Simran Singh of DNA India rated the film 3.5/5 stars and wrote "Although the plot of the Gehraiyaan' isn't novel, the treatment of the subject leaves an impression".
Sukanya Verna of Rediff rated the film 3.5/5 stars and wrote "Padukone embodies to perfection the Gehraiyaan in the title". Shilajit Mitra of The New Indian Express rated the film 3.5/5 stars and wrote "As a narrative, Gehraiyaan goes commendably far for a mainstream Hindi film. But its words tend to trip up the ride". Taran Adarsh of Bollywood Hungama rated the film 3/5 stars and wrote "GEHRAIYAAN is a mature relationship drama with niche appeal, bravura performances and an exciting climax". Phuong Le of The Guardian rated the film 3 out of 5 and said "While the lurid twists and turns are enjoyable in a 90s erotic thriller kind of way, the sudden shift towards suspense hampers Padukone's performance. And what a performance it is!"

Shubhra Gupta of The Indian Express gave the film 2 out of 5 and wrote "The foursome of Deepika Padukone, Siddhant Chaturvedi, Ananya Panday and Dhairya Karwa should have been a throbbing hot mess, but the film doesn't go deep enough". Saibal Chatterjee of NDTV gave the film 2 out of 5 and wrote "The film is about youthful, adventurous love, but it is utterly devoid of humour and zing. When it tries to lighten up, it falls flat". Shantanu Ray Chaudhari of The Free Press Journal'' gave the film 1 out of 5 and wrote "The writing veers between the trite and the ridiculous."

 Awards and nominations 

 23rd IIFA Awards:Nominated'''

 Best Music Director – Oaff and Savera
 Best Lyricist – Ankur Tewari for “Gehraiyaan”
 Best Male Playback Singer – Mohit Chauhan for “Gehraiyaan (Reprise)”
 Best Female Playback Singer – Lothika Jha for “Doobey”

References

External links 
 
 
 

Films postponed due to the COVID-19 pandemic
2020s Hindi-language films
Amazon Prime Video original films
Films shot in Mumbai